Francisco Gutiérrez (born 3 December 1941) is a Colombian sprinter. He competed in the men's 100 metres at the 1964 Summer Olympics.

References

1941 births
Living people
Athletes (track and field) at the 1964 Summer Olympics
Colombian male sprinters
Olympic athletes of Colombia
Place of birth missing (living people)
20th-century Colombian people